The 1998 Meghalaya Legislative Assembly election was held on 16 February 1998.

Results 

 The UDP was formed in 1997 through a merger of the Hill People's Union (HPU), some members of the Hill State People's Democratic Party (HDP) and the Public Demands Implementation Convention (PDIC). Previous results presented in the table are the combined totals of parties' results from the 1993 election.

Elected Members

References

State Assembly elections in Meghalaya
Meghalaya